The Anti-Album is the only studio album by American hip hop duo Semi.Official, consisting of rapper I Self Devine, a member of Micranots, and DJ Abilities, a member of Eyedea & Abilities. It was released September 16, 2003 on Rhymesayers Entertainment.

Music 
The album was produced by DJ Abilities. Guest appearances include Buddah Tye, Mr. Gene Poole and MF Doom.

Track listing

References

External links 
 The Anti-Album at Bandcamp
 The Anti-Album at Discogs

2003 debut albums
Rhymesayers Entertainment albums